The Mediterranean Division was a division consisting of the battlecruiser  and the light cruiser  of the German Kaiserliche Marine (Imperial Navy) in the early 1910s. It was established in response to the First Balkan War and saw action during the First World War.

Service

Pre-war
Therefore, the German General Staff determined that a larger naval presence was needed to give Germany the ability to project power in the Mediterranean. As a result, the battlecruiser  and the light cruiser  were despatched to join Loreley in Constantinople, forming the new Mediterranean Division. The two ships left Kiel on 4 November, and arrived on 15 November 1912. Following this trip, Goeben returned to Pola and remained there from 21 August to 16 October for maintenance.

On 29 June 1913, the Second Balkan War broke out. As a result, the Mediterranean Division would need to remain in the area. The end of the war saw the withdrawal back to Germany of Strassburg and Dresden, while on 23 October 1913, Konteradmiral Wilhelm Souchon assumed command of the squadron. Goeben and Breslau continued their activities in the Mediterranean, and visited some 80 ports before the outbreak of the First World War. The Navy intended on replacing Goeben with her sister  in June 1914, but the assassination of Archduke Franz Ferdinand in Sarajevo, Bosnia on 28 June 1914 and the subsequent rise in tensions between the Great Powers made this impossible.

In the immediate aftermath of the assassination, Souchon correctly assessed that war was imminent between the Central Powers and the Triple Entente. As a result, he ordered his ships to make for Pola for repairs. Engineers came from Germany to work on the ship. Goeben had 4,460 boiler tubes replaced, among other repairs. Upon completion, the ships departed for the French ports Bone and Phillipville, which they shelled in the early hours of August 4. From there, they departed for Messina, where they would be coaled by German merchant ships. They arrived in the early hours of August 5, coaled for 36 straight hours, protected from the British due to Italy's neutrality.

The pursuit

Milne thought that the Germans, after coaling at Messina, would break out to the west and try to escape to the Atlantic. Therefore, he positioned both his battlecruisers and Dublin at the west end of the Strait of Messina. The French also moved their Mediterranean fleet to guard the Gibraltar Strait. On August 6 they broke out of Messina and steamed northwards, feigning a move to the Adriatic Sea to make the British fleet drop back. However, after 5 hours of steaming west, Goeben decided to turn east as her coal supply was running low.

Goeben radioed Breslau to drop back and delay the Gloucester which would allow Goeben to reach a collier off the coast of Greece. Gloucester engaged Breslau with minor damage, and then tried to attack Goeben, but missed. Breslau was then able to continue on with Goeben. The battlecruisers had been approaching, but stopped after they received a false announcement that Austria-Hungary had declared war on England.  The squadron avoided action with a cruiser squadron under Rear-Admiral Sir Ernest Troubridge, and on August 10, the ships reached Constantinople.

First World War
After their arrival in Constantinople on 16 August 1914, the ships were transferred to the Turkish Navy, although they retained their German crews and captains. Soon after their transfer, Yavuz Sultan Selim shelled the Russian ports of Sevastopol, Odessa and Novorossiysk and intercepted the Russian fleet at the Battle of Cape Sarych. This helped push Turkey into World War I on the side of the Central Powers. The division then started to escort coal convoys and bombard Entente positions during the Dardanelles Campaign until the Battle of Imbros in early 1918. There, Midilli came under air attack and sank. Yavuz Sultan Selim also hit three mines, and came under attack by British torpedo boats and light bombers, but was towed to safety. The ships were officially transferred to the Ottoman Navy on 2 November 1918, nine days before the Armistice ended the war.

See also
Imperial German Navy order of battle (1914)

References

Bibliography
 
 

 
 

Military units and formations of the Imperial German Navy
Germany–Ottoman Empire relations
Military history of the Mediterranean
Naval units and formations of Germany in World War I